Serui Malay is a variety of the Papuan Malay language native to parts of the Indonesian province of Papua. It is spoken in the city of Serui and other places on the Yapen Islands, as well as in nearby coastal areas of the New Guinea mainland.

Though it is likely that Malay was used to an extent in previous centuries, its  widespread use and its current form date to the 20th century. Serui Malay is generally referred to as Bahasa Indonesia by its speakers, but it diverges from Standard Indonesian in a number of ways. It has similarities to Ambon Malay, but Van Velzen considers it to be more closely related to Ternate Malay.

History 
A large number of local languages are spoken in the area, and the need for a common lingua franca has been underlined by the centuries-old traditions of inter-group interaction in the form of slave-hunting, adoption, and intermarriage.
However, Malay was probably not widespread until the adoption of the language by the Dutch missionaries who arrived in the early 20th century and were then followed in this practice by the Dutch administrators.

Phonology 
People from West Yapen (Woi, Ansus, Pom) neutralise word-final nasals to []. Those from other ethnic groups do not have  because the phoneme is absent from their native languages. The distinction between /r/ and /l/ is clearer in the speech of educated people.

Grammar 

The morphology is more limited than in standard Indonesian. For example, passive voice or object focus are not marked on the verb, and verb bases are generally used without affixes. A smaller number of derivational affixes are used than in Indonesian. The productive verbal prefixes are the following:
 (corresponding to Indonesian ):  'contents' ->  'contain',  'child' ->  'have children';
 (corresponding to Indonesian ):  'beat' ->  'beaten'
 (Indonesian ). Used rarely:  'versus' ->  'be opposed to'
 (absent from Standard Indonesian, but available in Ambonese, Ternatan and Manadonese Malay). It has a reciprocal meaning:  'beat' ->  'beat each other',  'seduce' ->  'seduce each other';
, derives intransitive verbs:  'unwilling' ->  'not feel like'.
Reduplication is also used, with several meanings, both with nouns and with verbs:  'laugh' ->  'laugh repeatedly',  'stroll' ->  'stroll around',  'child' ->  'children',  'swab' ->  'cleaning rag'.

Possession is expressed using  (or its shortened form ):

Vocabulary 
Serui Malay diverges in a number of ways from Indonesian in its vocabulary. There are words that have extended or otherwise changed their meaning in comparison with Indonesian:
 means "moustache" in Standard Indonesian, but in Serui Malay it has developed a wider range of meanings: "moustache, beard, chest hair, sideboards"
 ("motor, motorcycle" in Indonesian) has similarly developed the meanings "motor, motor canoe, motorcycle, lungfish"
Indonesian  'kill' corresponds to Serui Malay , which has developed the additional meaning "switch off"
 'oar' is a noun in Indonesian, but in Serui Malay  it is a verb meaning 'paddle, row'; the very opposite change has occurred with the Indonesian verb  'row', which has become the noun  'oar'.

There are many words in Serui Malay not found in Standard Indonesian:
 'shell' (cf. Indonesian )
 'grandfather' (cf. Indonesian )
 'iguana' (cf. Indonesian )
 'messy' (a loan from Ambonese Malay, differs from Standard Indonesian )
 'chili pepper' (cf. Indonesian )
 'scabies' (cf. Indonesian )
 'mangrove trees' (cf. Indonesian )
 'sea urchin' (cf. Indonesian )
 'skin diving'
 'black magician'
 'Papuan'
 'exclamation of resistance'
 'seduce'
 'hermit crab'.

Serui Malay has borrowed vocabulary from Dutch, Portuguese, other Malay varieties and regional languages:
 'head' (from Portuguese )
 'chair' (from Portuguese )
 'muscle' (from Dutch )
 'square' (from Dutch )
 'give someone a hard time' (from Dutch )
 'department of forestry' (from Dutch ).

References

Bibliography 

Malay-based pidgins and creoles
Languages of Indonesia
Papua (province) culture
Yapen Islands